Templeton is a census-designated place (CDP) in San Luis Obispo County, California. The population was 7,674 at the 2010 census, up from 4,687 at the 2000 census.

Geography and climate

Geography
Templeton is located at  (35.553847, −120.709469). State Route 46 intersects U.S. 101 on the north edge of the town.

However, much of the surrounding unincorporated area between Atascadero and Paso Robles is considered as part of Templeton, with most U.S. mail for this area addressed as such.

Climate
Templeton has a Mediterranean climate that is characterized by mild winters and dry summers. The area usually has low humidity. Rain generally falls only between November and March, with the rainy season tapering off almost completely by the end of April.

Like much of the nearby area, Templeton occasionally receives significant but temporary fog through parts of the year. In summer, Templeton will occasionally receive fog due to its proximity with the California Coastal Range, Pacific Ocean, and the higher valley temperatures of Templeton itself; the differential in density between the warm rising air in the valley causes it to be displaced with the descent of the cooler marine air layer via the Templeton Gap in the Santa Lucia Range. Similarly, in winter, Templeton will occasionally receive morning fog due to the temperature differential with the Central Valley.

Economy

Templeton is home to numerous businesses that serve local agriculture and ranching, with the economy comprised most significantly from medical care including the Twin Cities Hospital, Templeton Unified School District, agriculture consisting primarily of vineyards and wineries, and assorted businesses on Main Street. Many residents work in nearby communities.
 
Templeton is emerging as a world class wine producer; with many of the wineries carrying the "Paso Robles" appellation actually located in the unincorporated Templeton area – including Castoro Cellars, Peachy Canyon, York Mountain, and Wild Horse.

There is a growing production of olive oil, with many small groves producing olives intended for consumption and oil, including Pasolivo.

History
These 160 acres were to be laid out in business and residential lots with 5–12 acre parcels, with the town to be named "Crocker" after a Vice President of the Southern Pacific Railroad, Charles F. Crocker; however, Crocker instead chose to name the town "Templeton," after his two-year-old son, Charles Templeton Crocker.

The town was briefly the end of the line for passengers travelling south via the Southern Pacific Railroad from northern California; passengers disembarked at Templeton and were then carried by stagecoach south to San Luis Obispo. Currently, the railroad stops in nearby Paso Robles before continuing on, and Templeton is classified as a bypass.

In 1898, a fire destroyed most of the original wooden buildings of the business district along Main Street, prompting this section of the town to be rebuilt with brick, although on a somewhat smaller scale than before.

2010
The 2010 United States Census reported that Templeton had a population of 7,674. The racial makeup of Templeton was 6,833 (89.0%) White, 59 (0.8%) African American, 80 (1.0%) Native American, 123 (1.6%) Asian, 10 (0.1%) Pacific Islander, 337 (4.4%) from other races, and 232 (3.0%) from two or more races. Hispanic or Latino of any race were 1,171 persons (15.3%).

The Census reported that 7,580 people (98.8% of the population) lived in households, 1 (0%) lived in non-institutionalized group quarters and 93 (1.2%) were institutionalized.

There were 2,830 households, of which 1,121 (39.6%) had children under the age of 18 living in them, 1,572 (55.5%) were opposite-sex married couples living together, 363 (12.8%) had a female householder with no husband present, 127 (4.5%) had a male householder with no wife present. There were 117 (4.1%) unmarried opposite-sex partnerships and 29 (1.0%) same-sex married couples or partnerships. 654 households (23.1%) were made up of individuals, and 352 (12.4%) had someone living alone who was 65 years of age or older. The average household size was 2.68.  There were 2,062 families (72.9% of all households); the average family size was 3.14.

2,049 people (26.7%) of the population were under the age of 18, 598 people (7.8%) aged 18 to 24, 1,627 people (21.2%) aged 25 to 44, 2,288 people (29.8%) aged 45 to 64, and 1,112 people (14.5%) who were 65 years of age or older. The median age was 40.8 years. For every 100 females, there were 89.1 males. For every 100 females age 18 and over, there were 84.6 males.

The homeowner vacancy rate was 1.2%; the rental vacancy rate was 6.9%.  5,453 people (71.1% of the population) lived in owner-occupied housing units and 2,127 people (27.7%) lived in rental housing units.

2000
At the 2000 census, there were 4,687 people, 1,548 households and 1,247 families residing in the CDP. The racial makeup of the CDP was 90.36% White, 1.17% African American, 0.70% Native American, 0.92% Asian, 0.09% Pacific Islander, 3.63% from other races, and 3.14% from two or more races. Hispanic or Latino of any race were 11.82% of the population.

There were 1,548 households, of which 49.7% had children under the age of 18 living with them, 65.4% were married couples living together, 11.5% had a female householder with no husband present, and 19.4% were non-families. 15.6% of all households were made up of individuals, and 7.8% had someone living alone who was 65 years of age or older. The average household size was 2.98 and the average family size was 3.33.

33.7% of the population were under the age of 18, 5.9% from 18 to 24, 29.8% from 25 to 44, 19.2% from 45 to 64, and 11.5% who were 65 years of age or older. The median age was 36 years. For every 100 females, there were 93.2 males. For every 100 females age 18 and over, there were 88.4 males.

The median household income was $53,438 and the median family income was $58,750. Males had a median income of $41,268 compared with $32,034 for females. The per capita income for the CDP was $19,671. About 6.3% of families and 9.1% of the population were below the poverty line, including 11.5% of those under age 18 and 4.7% of those age 65 or over.

Government

Local  
Templeton is governed by the five-member board of the Templeton Community Services District.

The current board members are: 
 President: Debra Logan 
 Vice President: Wayne Petersen
 Board members: Geoff English, Navid Fardanesh, and Pamela Jardini

State and federal 

Schools 
Templeton High School - grades 9 to 12
Templeton Middle School - grades 6 to 8
Vineyard Elementary School - grades 3 to 5
Templeton Elementary School - kindergarten to 2

Public schools in Templeton are located in and operated by the Templeton Unified School District, which notably includes Templeton High School, which was selected as a National Blue Ribbon High School in 2006, having previously been selected in both 1999 and 2005 as one of 64 schools out of 860 in the state of California as a California Distinguished School.

Notable people 

Josh Brolin, actor, raised in Templeton
Brian Barden, baseball player, born in Templeton
Savannah Camacho, Brooks Running pro athlete/three-time Big 12 Conference champion
Lindsay Campana, North Carolina State softball ERA record-holder
Kurtis "Miss Fame" Dam-Mikkelsen, American drag queen, makeup artist, model, and recording artist
Teddy Dellaganna, Big East football player of the week
Charles Douglass, inventor of the laugh track
Stewart Finlay-McLennan, actor
Tyler Gray, Miami Dolphins NFL linebacker
Spencer Howard, MLB pitcher
Sandy Koufax, Hall of Fame baseball player
Jake Romanelli, FCS All-American fullback

References

External links

Templeton Chamber of Commerce

Census-designated places in San Luis Obispo County, California
Census-designated places in California